Köseceli is a town (belde) and municipality in the Besni District, Adıyaman Province, Turkey. The town had a population of 1,948 in 2021.

The settlements of Aşağı Söğütlü and Tetirli are attached to Köseceli. Tetirli is populated by Kurds of the Hevêdan tribe.

References

Towns in Turkey
Populated places in Adıyaman Province
Besni District

Kurdish settlements in Adıyaman Province